The William Langton was  Dean of Clogher from 1743 until his death in Derbyshire, by falling from his horse, on 28 July 1761.

Notes

Deans of Clogher
18th-century Irish Anglican priests